
Adherbal (died 230BC), also known as Atarbas (Atárbas), was the admiral of the Carthaginian fleet which battled the Romans for domination of the Mediterranean Sea during the First Punic War (264–241BC). Polybius identified Adherbal during the Battle of Drepana as the Carthaginian commander-in-chief. He led the Carthaginian fleet to Drepana in Sicily and inflicted a crushing defeat on the Roman consul P. Claudius Pulcher during the naval battle in 249BC.

Battle of Drepana 
Encouraged by previous victories, the new consul for 250 Gaius Atilius Regulus launched a campaign to attack the last Punic strongholds on the island of Sicily: Lilybaeum and Drepana. For this surprise attack, which was carried out in 249, the Romans mustered a fleet of 123 quinqueremes. Adherbal was tasked to defend Drepana with the assistance of Hannibal the Rhodian and Carthalo. In their desire for stealth, the Romans attacked at night causing them to lose their formation. Adherbal commanded the Punic fleet and immediately ordered his forces to set to sea when the straggling line of Roman galleys approached the shore by dawn. His defense cost the Romans 93 ships while Carthage lost nothing.  

Adherbal's conduct during the siege was documented by historians such as Polybius and Leonardo Bruni. The latter, for instance, described the admiral delivering an oratio obliqua before his forces as he led them to meet the Romans. He would later write that Adherbal "won great praise as the man who, by virtue of his courage and skill, restored to his fellow Carthaginians their lost reputation as a sea power."

References

Citations

Bibliography
 . 
 

Carthaginian commanders of the First Punic War
Admirals
3rd-century BC births
230 BC deaths
Year of birth unknown
3rd-century BC Punic people